Needhamiella is a monotypic genus in the family Ericaceae. The sole species, Needhamiella pumilio, is a small shrub that is endemic to Western Australia.

The genus was first formally described in 1810 by botanist Robert Brown who gave it the name Needhamia. This was subsequently declared an illegitimate name as Italian naturalist Giovanni Antonio Scopoli had assigned it to a genus in the family Leguminosae in 1777. In 1965 the genus was given the revised name Needhamiella.

References

Epacridoideae
Ericales of Australia
Eudicots of Western Australia
Monotypic Ericaceae genera